it:Martiri del Campo di Marte

The Martyrs of Campo di Marte were five men executed in the Campo di Marte borough of Florence by the forces of the Fascist Italian Social Republic (RSI) for refusing to be drafted into the military, and for suspicion of Partisan activity.

Context 
After a Partisan attack on the town of Vicchio during which several Fascists were killed on March 6, 1944, the forces of RSI general Enrico Adami Rossi combed the town for Partisan collaborators, discovering in the process five young men who had dodged the military draft imposed by the RSI. They were swiftly condemned to death by the extraordinary military tribunal established the previous month by Rossi, and executed by firing squad ten days later on March 22.

Several days later on March 30, the Italian Fascist philosopher Giovanni Gentile received a death threat letter which read:

Gentile was assassinated by the communist Gruppi di Azione Patriottica shortly afterwards on April 15.

List of victims 
The five men are:
 Antonio Raddi
 Guido Targetti
 Leandro Corona
 Ottorino Quiti
 Adriano Santoni

All were around twenty years old. The five victims were posthumously awarded the Gold Medal for Civil Valor by president Giorgio Napolitano in April 2008. Since Ottorino Quiti had no living next of kin, his medal was accepted by the mayor of Vicchio, Elettra Lorini.

References 

Partisans during World War II
1944 in Italy